Ruslan Mirzayev (born March 30, 1989) is an Uzbek film producer and director. Mirzayev began his film production career in 2011 by shooting the film Yondiradi Kuydiradi.

Life 
Ruslan Mirzayev was born on March 30, 1989, in Gomel, Belarus SSR, Soviet Union. He studied cinematography at the College of Cinema, Video and Technology. After graduating from college, he studied at the Faculty of Cinematography of the Uzbek State Institute of Arts and Culture. He began his film production career in 2011 by shooting the film Yondiradi Kuydiradi. He is best known in the movie world through his film Sniper.

Career activities

Collaboration with Turkish filmmakers 
The collaboration with Turkish filmmakers began with the shooting of Sniper. The film was directed by Ozod Shams and produced by Ruslan Mirzayev, starring Uzbek and Turkish actors. After that, there were rumors on the Internet that a film called My Sun (Güneşim benim) would be shot in collaboration with the Turks, and that the film could receive high ratings. However, shortly afterwards, the film's producer, Ruslan Mirzayev, announced that they had not been able to raise enough money to make the film and began filming the series Battle of the Hearts (Yuraklar jangi) instead. Then, under the leadership of Mirzayev, the team began filming the series Games of Love in collaboration with the screenwriter of the film Valley of the Wolves. After that, Ruslan Mirzayev began working with the Turks on the film Billionaire from Istanbul.

Filmography 
Below is a chronologically ordered list of films in which Ruslan Mirzayev has appeared.

As a film producer

Series

As director

As actor

References

External links
 
Ruslan Mirzayev Instagram
 Ruslan Mirzayev Facebook

1989 births
Living people
Uzbekistani film producers
Uzbekistani film directors
Uzbekistani film actors
People from Gomel